Bhāsa is one of the earliest and most celebrated Indian playwrights in Sanskrit, predating Kalidasa. His name was already well-known by the 1st century BCE and he belongs to the late-Mauryan (322-184 BCE) period at the earliest, but the thirteen plays attached to his name are commonly dated closer to the first or second century CE.  

His plays had been lost for centuries until the manuscripts were rediscovered in 1913 by the Indian scholar Ganapati Shastri. Bhāsa had previously only been known from mentions in other works, like the Kavyamimamsa on poetics from 880–920 AD. In the Kavyamimamsa, Rajashekhara attributes the play Swapnavasavadattam to Bhāsa.

In the introduction to his first play Malavikagnimitram, Kālidāsa wrote:
"Shall we neglect the works of such illustrious authors as Bhāsa, Saumilla, and Kaviputra? Can the audience feel any respect for the work of a modern poet, a Kālidāsa?"

Date
Bhāsa's date of birth is uncertain, but his name was already known as a famous dramatist by the 1st century BCE. He belongs to the late-Mauryan period at the earliest and fourth century CE at the latest.  Bhāsa's language is closer to Kālidāsa (5th century CE) than it is to Aśvaghoṣa (1st-2nd century CE).

Bhāsa's works do not follow all the dictates of the Natya Shastra. This has been taken as a proof of their antiquity; no post-Kālidāsa play has been found to break the rules of the Natya Shastra. Scenes from Bhāsa present signs of physical violence on the stage, as in plays like Urubhanga. This is strictly frowned upon by Natya Shastra. However, these facts alone don't make chronology certain. Indu Shekhar states that, "Whatever the exact date [of Natya Shastra] may have been, it is significant that no direct reference to NS was made before the seventh century," when it became accepted as the subject of attention for many poets, writers, and theorists.

Discovery of his plays
In the year 1909 the play Swapnavasavadatta was discovered by Pandit Anandalvar of the Archeological Survey of Mysore. Two years later the Mahamahopadhyaya T. Ganapati Sastri came upon 13 Sanskrit plays that were used in the Koodiyattam plays. The first discovery yielded ten complete manuscripts (Svapnavasavadattam, Pratijnayaugandharayana, Pancharatra, Charudatta, Dootaghatotkacha, Avimaraka, Balacharita, Madhyamavyayoga, Karnabhara and Urubhanga) and fragments of one. Later, he found two more: Abhisheka and Pratimanataka. Finally, he found intact manuscript of Dootavakyam, adding up to total thirteen plays believed to be authored by Bhasa. Unlike other classical plays, none of them mentioned the author, but one was the Swapnavāsavadatta. Comparing the style of writing and techniques employed in these plays and based on the knowledge that Swapnavāsavadatta was Bhāsa's work, all of them were credited to him. Some scholars have disputed Bhāsa's authorship of all the plays but over the years the plays have generally come to be ascribed to Bhāsa.

Plays of Bhāsa

The Uru-Bhanga and Karna-bhara are the only known tragic Sanskrit plays in ancient India. Though branded the villain of the Mahabharata, Duryodhana is the actual hero in Uru-Bhanga shown repenting his past as he lies with his thighs crushed awaiting death. His relations with his family are shown with great pathos. The epic contains no reference to such repentance. The Karna-bhara ends with the premonitions of the sad end of Karna, another epic character from Mahabharata. Early plays in India, inspired by Natya Shastra, strictly considered sad endings inappropriate.

The plays are generally short compared to later playwrights and most of them draw on themes from the Indian epics, Mahabharata and Ramayana. Though he is firmly on the side of the heroes of the epic, Bhāsa treats their opponents with great sympathy. He takes a lot of liberties with the story to achieve this. In the Pratima-nataka, Kaikeyi who is responsible for the tragic events in the Ramayana is shown as enduring the calumny of all so that a far noble end is achieved.

Plays based on Ramayana
 Pratima-nataka: The statues 
 Yagna-Phalam:
 Abhisheka-natka: The coronation

Plays based on Mahabharata

 Panch-ratra: The five-nights
 Madhyama-vyayoga: The middle one
 Duta-Ghattotkacha: Ghattotkacha as envoy
 Duta-Vakya : The envoy's message
 Urubhanga: The broken thigh
 Karnabharam: Karna's burden
 Harivamsa or Bala-charita: Hari's dynasty or the tale of Childhood

The Duta-Vakya and Bala-charita are perhaps the only Sanskrit plays by a famous playwright with Krishna as the central character.

His other plays are not epic based. Avimaraka is a fairy tale, which later became part of a Mani Kaul film, The Cloud Door (1994). The unfinished Daridra-Charudatta (Charudatta in poverty) tells the story of the courtesan Vasantasena and is interesting for the same story was developed by Śhudraka into the more famous play Mrichakatika.

His most famous plays — Pratigya Yaugandharayanam (the vow of Yaugandharayana) and Swapnavāsavadattam (Vasavadatta in the dream) — are based on the legends that had grown around the legendary King Udayana, probably a contemporary of the Buddha. The first play tells the story of how the king Udayana married the princess Vasavadatta (his first wife).The second play tells the story of how the king Udayana, with the help of his loyal minister Yaugandharayana, later married the princess Padmavati, a daughter of the king of Magadha, and thus made this king his ally rather than enemy.

Though his plays were discovered only in the 20th century, two of them, Uru-Bhanga and Karna-bhara, have become popular due to their appeal to modern tastes and have been performed in translation and in Sanskrit.

Many of Bhasa's plays are staged in Koodiyattam even now, like parts of Pratijna-Yaugandharayana, Abhisheka-nataka etc.

Modern revival

The first person to revive Bhasa in modern Indian theatre was a Professor of Ancient Indian Drama at National School of Drama, and theatre director, Shanta Gandhi, who first directed productions of Madhyamavyayoga (1966) ("The Middle One") and Urubhanga ("The Broken Thigh") in Hindi. A decade later, his work was approached by playwright Kavalam Narayan Panikkar and theatre director, Ratan Thiyam using Manipuri dance and theatre traditions, and traditional martial art of Thang-Ta, who first performed Karna-bhara ("Karna's burden") in 1976, and later Urubhanga.

Waman Kendre did an adaptation of Madhyama Vyāyoga in three different languages: O My Love in English, Mohe Piya in Hindi and Piya Bawari in Marathi.

The legendary Natyasastra scholar and Koodiyattam maestro Guru Mani Madhava Chakyar choreographed and started to perform Swapnavāsadatta and Pancharātra for the first time in the history of Koodiyattam.

See also
 Sanskrit literature
 Sanskrit drama
 Urubhanga

Notes

References
 Thirteen Trivandrum plays ascribed to Bhāsa( 2 Vols), translated by H.C.Woolner, Lakshman Sarup, 193
 
 
 Encyclopaedia of Indian Theatre: Bhasa, by Biswajit Sinha, Ashok Kumar Choudhury. Raj Publications, 2000. .

Further reading 

A.D. Pusalker : Bhasa – a study.  Munshiram Manoharlal Publishers Pvt. Ltd. New Delhi, India 1968
V. Venkatachalam : Bhasa (A monograph in the 'Indian Men of Letter Series'), Sahitya Akademi, New Delhi, 1986; Second Edn. 1994; (pp. 16+192) (Translated into Bengali, Gujarati, Kannada and Telugu-Pub. By Sahitya Akademi)

Sanskrit poets
Ancient Indian poets
Ancient Indian dramatists and playwrights
Sanskrit dramatists and playwrights
Indian male poets
Indian male dramatists and playwrights
Koodiyattam exponents
3rd-century Indian writers
4th-century Indian writers